These are the official results of the athletics competition at the 2017 Jeux de la Francophonie which took place at the 	Stade Félix Houphouët-Boigny between 23 and 27 July 2017 in Abidjan, Ivory Coast.

Men's results

100 metres

Heats – 23 JulyWind:Heat 1: +0.9 m/s, Heat 2: +0.3 m/s, Heat 3: -0.4 m/s

Final – 24 JulyWind:+0.1 m/s

200 metres

Heats – 26 JulyWind:Heat 1: -1.7 m/s, Heat 2: -1.7 m/s, Heat 3: -2.2 m/s

Final – 27 JulyWind:-1.0 m/s

400 metres

Heats – 25 July

Final – 26 July

800 metres

Heats – 23 July

Final – 24 July

1500 metres

Heats – 25 July

Final – 27 July

5000 metres
27 July

10,000 metres
23 July

Marathon
23 July

110 metres hurdles
25 JulyWind: +1.5 m/s

400 metres hurdles
24 July

3000 metres steeplechase
24 July

4 × 100 metres relay
25 July

4 × 400 metres relay
Heats – 26 July

Final – 27 July

20 kilometres walk
27 July

High jump
25 July

Pole vault
27 July

Long jump
27 July

Triple jump
24 July

Shot put
23 July

Discus throw
26 July

Javelin throw
25 July

Decathlon
25–26 July

Women's results

100 metres

Heats – 23 JulyWind:Heat 1: -0.1 m/s, Heat 2: +0.4 m/s, Heat 3: +0.8 m/s

Final – 24 JulyWind:-0.5 m/s

200 metres

Heats – 26 JulyWind:Heat 1: -1.0 m/s, Heat 2: -0.3 m/s, Heat 3: -1.8 m/s

Final – 27 JulyWind:-1.2 m/s

400 metres

Heats – 25 July

Final – 26 July

800 metres

Heats – 23 July

Final – 24 July

1500 metres
27 July

5000 metres
26 July

10,000 metres
24 July

Marathon
23 July

100 metres hurdles

Heats – 24 JulyWind:Heat 1: +1.7 m/s, Heat 2: +1.5 m/s

Final – 25 JulyWind:+0.3 m/s

400 metres hurdles
24 July

3000 metres steeplechase
25 July

4 × 100 metres relay
25 July

20 kilometres walk
27 July

High jump
26 July

Pole vault
24 July

Long jump
26 July

Triple jump
24 July

Shot put
25 July

Hammer throw
27 July

Javelin throw
26 July

References

Jeux de la Francophonie
2017